Mohanlalganj is a constituency of the Uttar Pradesh Legislative Assembly covering the city of Mohanlalganj in the Lucknow district of Uttar Pradesh, India.

Mohanlalganj is one of five assembly constituencies in the Mohanlalganj Lok Sabha constituency. Since 2008, this assembly constituency is numbered 176 amongst 403 constituencies.

Vidhan Sabha Members
 1957 : Two candidates represented this seat in Vidhan Sabha
 1962 : Ram Shanker Ravivasi (INC)
 1964 by-poll : Khyali Ram (PSP)
 1967 : Narayan Das (INC)
 1996:R K Chaudhary (BSP)
 2002:R K Chaudhary (RSP/BS-4)
 2007:R K Chaudhary  (BS-4)
 2012 : Chandra Rawat (SP) 
 2017 : Ambrish Singh Pushkar (SP)

Election results

2022

2017
Samajwadi Party candidate Ambrish Singh Pushkar (Advocate) won in last Assembly election of 2017 Uttar Pradesh Legislative Elections defeating Bahujan Samaj Party candidate Rambahadur Rawat retired I.A.S. officer of U.P. cadre by a margin of 530 votes.

 Ambrish Singh Pushkar (SP) : 71,574 votes  
 Ram Bahadur (BSP) : 71,044

1964 by-poll
 Khyali Ram (PSP) : 10,759 votes
 Prabhoo Dayal (Jana Sangh) : 9,442

1962 
 Ram Shanker Ravivasi (INC) : 8,913 votes 
 Khyali Ram (PSP) : 8,888 votes

References

External links
 

Assembly constituencies of Uttar Pradesh
Politics of Lucknow district